The 2023 Nigerian Senate elections in Bauchi State will be held on 25 February 2023, to elect the 3 federal Senators from Bauchi State, one from each of the state's three senatorial districts. The elections will coincide with the 2023 presidential election, as well as other elections to the Senate and elections to the House of Representatives; with state elections being held two weeks later. Primaries were held between 4 April and 9 June 2022.

Background
In the previous Senate elections, only one of the three incumbent senators were returned, with South District Senator Lawal Yahaya Gumau (APC) being re-elected while both APC-turned-PDP senators (Central District's Isah Misau and the North District's Sulaiman Mohammed Nazif) were defeated in their re-election bids. In the South district, Gumau held his seat for the PDP with 52% of the vote while Halliru Dauda Jika (APC) unseated Misau with 50% of the vote in the North district; in the Central seat, Nazif was pushed to third place in a race won by Adamu Muhammad Bulkachuwa (APC). These results were a part of a good 2019 showing for the APC in Bauchi elections as Buhari won the state and the party retained control of the House of Assembly while the House of Representatives seats split between the APC and PDP. On the other hand, former minister Bala Mohammed—the PDP gubernatorial nominee—unseated APC incumbent Mohammed Abdullahi Abubakar by a narrow margin.

In the first half of the 2019–2023 term, the three senators were noted for their remarkably low output as Jika and Gumau sponsored no motions or petitions while Bulkachuwa only sponsored two motions—both in memoriam speeches. The three senators also had few bills as Gumau and Bulkachuwa had a single bill in over two years while Jika only had two. In 2022, Jika and Gumau defected to the NNPP while Bulkachuwa moved to the PDP.

Overview

Summary

Bauchi Central 

The Bauchi Central Senatorial District covers the local government areas of Damban, Darazo, Ganjuwa, Misau, Ningi, and Warji. The incumbent is Halliru Dauda Jika (NNPP), who was elected with 49.8% of the vote in 2019 as a member of the APC. In early 2022, Jika decided to run for governor of Bauchi State, instead of seeking re-election; however, he lost the APC primary and promptly defected to the NNPP in June 2022 to become its gubernatorial nominee.

Primary elections

All Progressives Congress 

The primary resulted in Uba Ahmed Nana emerging as the nominee after results showed him defeating former Senator Isah Hamma Misau by a 49% margin.

People's Democratic Party 

On the primary date, former Senator Abdul Ahmed Ningi was the only candidate and thus was nominated unopposed.

Campaign
In December 2022, analysis from The Nation categorized Ningi as the frontrunner due to his political clout and the relatively low name recognition of Nana.

General election

Results

Bauchi North 

The Bauchi North district covers the local government areas of Gamawa, Giade, Itas/Gadau, Jamaare, Katagum, Shira, and Zaki. The incumbent Adamu Muhammad Bulkachuwa (APC), who was elected with 39.7% of the vote in 2019, sought re-election but lost APC renomination. In November 2022, Bulkachuwa decamped to the PDP.

Primary elections

All Progressives Congress 

The primary resulted in Siraj Ibrahim Tanko Muhammad—son of then-Supreme Court Chief Justice Ibrahim Tanko Muhammad—defeating Ibrahim Baba for the nomination after results showed a 3% margin of victory; Bulkachuwa came last without any votes. The win was controversial due to allegations that Muhammad used his father's position to steal public funds used to bribe delegates with cars, cash, and jobs in the judiciary. These allegations purportedly led to Ibrahim Tanko Muhammad's resignation as Chief Justice in July 2022 amid other scandals as well. The nomination itself was categorized as another example of the formation of political family dynasties as Muhammad was one of many political family scions to win primaries.

People's Democratic Party 

The Azare-held primary resulted in victory for Sama’ila Dahuwa—former Commissioner of Health in the Bala Mohammed administration. Dahuwa beat chemist Laraba Gambo Abdullahi by a 27% margin of victory. In his acceptance speech, Dahuwa praised his former opponents and asked for their support going forward.

Campaign

General election

Results

Bauchi South 

The Bauchi South Senatorial District covers the local government areas of Alkaleri, Bauchi, Bogoro, Dass, Kirfi, Tafawa Balewa, and Toro. The incumbent is Lawal Yahaya Gumau (NNPP), who was elected with 51.9% of the vote in 2019 as a member of the APC. Gumau originally sought re-election in the APC but lost the primary before defecting to the NNPP in May 2022 and obtaining its senatorial nomination.

Primary elections

All Progressives Congress 

The primary in Bauchi resulted in Shehu Buba Umar defeating Gumau for the nomination by just 6 votes. Gumau promptly left the APC to run as the NNPP nominee. The nomination of Umar was briefly annulled after a November court ruling, but the appeal ended with Umar's reinstatement as nominee.

New Nigeria Peoples Party 
The national NNPP announced its primary schedule on 12 April 2022, setting its expression of interest form price at ₦0.5 million and the nomination form price at ₦2.5 million with forms being sold from 10 April to 5 May. The rest of the timetable was revised on 19 May; after the purchase and submission of forms, senatorial candidates were screened by a party committee on 25 May while the screening appeal process was held on the next day. Ward congresses were set for 22 April to elect delegates for the primary. Candidates approved by the screening process advanced to a primary set for 28 May, in concurrence with all other NNPP gubernatorial primaries; challenges to the result could be made the next day.

Originally Yakubu Shehu Abdullahi—MHR for Bauchi—claimed to have been given an "automatic ticket" by party leadership as NNPP nominee, a few days after he defected from the APC in May 2022. However, the party promptly held a primary after Gumau joined and nominated him unanimously instead at a primary in Bauchi on 5 June. In response, Abdullahi labeled the primary as "a charade" and claimed to be "the authentic candidate of the NNPP."

People's Democratic Party 

The primary resulted in victory for Dahiru Garba—former Commissioner of Commerce in the Bala Mohammed administration. Dahuwa beat Mahiru Maiwada by a single vote. After tabulation, Garba asked for the support of his former opponents. However, the ruling of a Federal High Court sitting in Owerri in mid-November 2022 annulled the primary and ordered the party to conduct a new exercise. In compliance with the ruling, a rerun primary was held on 30 November with Garba winning by a wide margin; however, most other aspirants were absent from the venue.

Campaign
In review of the campaign in December 2022, reporting from The Nation categorized Gumau as the frontrunner due to the relatively low name recognition of his opponents and the controversial PDP primary.

General election

Results

See also 
 2023 Nigerian Senate election
 2023 Nigerian elections

Notes

References 

Bauchi State senatorial elections
2023 Bauchi State elections
Bauchi State Senate elections